The Géologique du Luberon National Nature Reserve (RNN90) is a national nature reserve located in Provence-Alpes-Côte d'Azur. Established in 1987, it occupies  and protects 28 scattered geological sites dated from the Cenozoic.

Administration and legal status
The nature reserve was established under a decree of the 16 September 1987.

It was established in order to protect 28 geological sites from the Cenozoic era, divided in 4 categories: sites with fossils of vertebrates, insects and plants from the Oligocene, slabs bearing the tracks of mammals from the Oligocene, sites with vertebrates from the Eocene and Miocene, sites with invertebrates from the Miocene and Pliocene.

The nature reserve is administered by the Parc naturel régional du Luberon.

Location and sites
The domain of the nature reserve spreads over the Alpes-de-Haute-Provence and Vaucluse departments.
 Alpes-de-Haute-Provence : Aubenas-les-Alpes, Céreste, Montfuron, Montjustin, Oppedette, Reillanne, Revest-des-Brousses, Saint-Maime, Vachères et Villeneuve.
 Vaucluse : Bonnieux, Cabrières-d'Aigues, Caseneuve, Cheval-Blanc, Cucuron, Murs, Saignon, Saint-Martin-de-Castillon, Saint-Saturnin-lès-Apt, Viens.

Aubenas-les-Alpes
The village of Aubenas-les-Alpes was built over an hill of red marl dating from the Oligocene. It contains the bones of large mammals and reptiles (such as crocodiles and turtles). In the vallon de l'Aiguebelle (an ever-flowing stream, even during the dryest droughts), fossils of plants and fishes (Dapalis macrurus) have been uncovered. Both those deposits are classified geological reserves (inside the Géologique du Luberon National Nature Reserve), and any collection is forbidden. Information panels are placed near the sites. A selection of the unearthed fossils can be seen in the Musée de Vachères, at the Maison du Parc Naturel Régional du Luberon, at Apt in Vaucluse, and at the National Museum of Natural History in Paris.

Céreste

50 millions of years ago, at the beginning of the Eocene, the Apt and Céreste basins were covered by a vast inner lake. A tropical climate had created a rich fauna and flora, fossilized in thin plates of schistous limestone up to the Oligocene. Those various fossils correspond to a riverine flora and fishes, molluscs and insects.

Easy access to the fossil sites allowed their pillage, to the degree that their removal appeared almost organized. The actions of the  allowed the fossils at the site to diminish by 95%. The commune of Céreste is today inside the perimeter of the Géologique du Luberon National Nature Reserve, due to the proximity with exceptional fossil sites.

Reillanne
During the 1950s, numerous fossil tracks were identified in Reillanne and around the Pas d'Ânes locality. Traditionally considered to be donkey tracks, it was discovered that the footprints were made by Anchitherium, an extinct genus of Equidae who lived roughly 20 millions of years ago.

Murs, Vaucluse

This zone is protected and digging and collecting are strictly forbidden by law. It bears marl limestones of continental facies from the Cenozoic era (Rupelian). It has provided fossils of fishes, and of the leaves and cuticles of plants.

Saignon
Located at Le Carlet, to the southeast of Saignon's train station, is the Négri quarry. In 1981, an examination of the quarry's surface limestone layer revealed preserved fossil tracks. Thousands of tracks can be seen across the surface of what was a marshy soil dating back from the Oligocene. Traces of Palaeotherium magnum, Anchilophus radegondensis, Anoplotherium commune and A. latipes, Xiphodon gracile, Pterodon spp. and Hyanodon spp. were identified, as well as unique forms and tracks of large birds.

Viens
At Viens, Vaucluse,  ('slabs of Viens') contain fossilized tracksites of Oligocene mammals.

Notes

References

Protected areas established in 1987
Regional natural parks of France
Geography of Alpes-de-Haute-Provence
Geography of Vaucluse
Tourist attractions in Vaucluse
Tourist attractions in Alpes-de-Haute-Provence
Geologic formations of France
Cenozoic Europe
Fossiliferous stratigraphic units of Europe
Paleontology in France
Alpes-de-Haute-Provence
Vaucluse